
Gmina Skąpe is a rural gmina (administrative district) in Świebodzin County, Lubusz Voivodeship, in western Poland.

The gmina contains part of the protected area called Gryżyna Landscape Park.

Villages
Gmina Skąpe contains the villages and settlements of Błonie, Cibórz, Cząbry, Darnawa, Kalinowo, Kaliszkowice, Łąkie, Międzylesie, Niekarzyn, Niesulice, Ołobok, Pałck, Podła Góra, Przetocznica, Przetocznicki Młyn, Radoszyn, Rokitnica, Skąpe, Węgrzynice, Zawisze and Złoty Potok.

Neighbouring gminas
Gmina Skąpe is bordered by the gminas of Bytnica, Czerwieńsk, Łagów, Lubrza, Sulechów and Świebodzin.

References

Skape
Świebodzin County